Fenaroli is an Italian surname. Notable people with the surname include:

Fedele Fenaroli (1730–1818), Italian composer
Giuseppe Fenaroli Avogadro (1760–1825), Italian politician
Luigi Fenaroli (1899–1980), Italian botanist and agronomist

Italian-language surnames